Emma Louise Beckett (born 29 May 1987) is an Irish football midfielder who plays for Watford and the Ireland national team.

Club career
With her hometown club Northampton Town, Beckett was part of a treble-winning team in 2004–05. Beckett later became a journeywoman, playing for several FA Women's Premier League teams in Greater London. In 2015, after accepting an offer to join Amazon Grimstad of the Norwegian Toppserien, Beckett quipped that she had "more clubs than Tiger Woods". She left London Bees, where she had been the captain, to join Tottenham Hotspur in January 2019. Later that year Spurs took on seven new players and eleven players were not included. These players including Beckett, Sarah Wiltshire and top scorer Bianca Baptiste had to find new roles.

International career
Although born and raised in England, Beckett was eligible to play for Ireland or Northern Ireland as her parents came from Roscommon and Cork.

On 5 May 2014, Republic of Ireland women's national football team manager Susan Ronan named Beckett in an experimental squad for a friendly against the Basque Country. Beckett started the game in Ireland's 2–0 defeat in Azpeitia, which was not classified as a full international fixture.

Beckett retained her place in the national team for a January 2015 training camp in La Manga, Spain. She was a half-time substitute for Louise Quinn in a 3–1 training match defeat by Norway at La Manga Stadium. She also played against Slovakia at the 2015 Istria Cup, after a groin injury kept her out of Ireland's opening match against Hungary.

In August 2016 Ronan recalled Beckett to a young and predominantly home-based senior squad for a training camp in Wales. She played in two challenge matches against the Welsh hosts, winning mild praise from Ronan: "Emma Beckett who was recalled to the squad did herself no harm".

References

External links

Profile at Tottenham Hotspur

1987 births
Living people
Women's association football midfielders
Republic of Ireland women's international footballers
Republic of Ireland women's association footballers
London Bees players
Watford F.C. Women players
Fulham L.F.C. players
Tottenham Hotspur F.C. Women players
Millwall Lionesses L.F.C. players
Charlton Athletic W.F.C. players
FA Women's National League players
Footballers from Northampton
Amazon Grimstad players
Toppserien players
Irish expatriate sportspeople in Norway
Expatriate women's footballers in Norway
English people of Irish descent